William Reid Williams (1866 - July 24, 1931) was the United States Assistant Secretary of War from 1920 to 1921.

Biography
He was born in 1866. He was the United States Assistant Secretary of War from 1920 to 1921. He died on July 24, 1931, in Richmond, Virginia.

References

1866 births
1931 deaths
United States Assistant Secretaries of War